Conacher and Co was a firm of British organ builders based in Huddersfield, West Yorkshire, England.

History
The firm originated with Peter Conacher (1823–1894), who was born in Scotland and who studied as an apprentice organ builder in Leipzig, Germany. After returning to England, he worked for Hill & Sons based in Lincolnshire, and then for Walker & Sons in London. 

Conacher started his own company in 1854, initially with Richard Brown, then from 1859 with Joseph Hebblethwaite. They built a factory in George Street, Huddersfield. On the death of Hebblethwaite, Peter was joined by his brother James (1820–1886). They built an organ for the Yorkshire Exhibition of 1866; the instrument was awarded a grand medal and was installed in St Peter's Church, Huddersfield.

In 1873 the company moved to the Springwood Organ Works, Water Street, Huddersfield. Peter's son, Joseph Hebblethwaite Conacher (1856–1913), joined the family firm in 1879 and succeeded his father in the business in 1898.

In 1986, the firm was acquired by John Sinclair Willis, formerly of Henry Willis & Sons and great-grandson of the notable English organ builder "Father" Henry Willis.

References

British pipe organ builders
Organ builders of the United Kingdom
Companies established in 1854
Musical instrument manufacturing companies of the United Kingdom
Companies based in Huddersfield
1854 establishments in the United Kingdom